Wolfgang Mechler (born 21 March 1955) is a German water polo player. He competed in the men's tournament at the 1976 Summer Olympics.

References

1955 births
Living people
German male water polo players
Olympic water polo players of West Germany
Water polo players at the 1976 Summer Olympics
Sportspeople from Würzburg